TrueNAS is the branding for a range of free and open-source network-attached storage (NAS) operating systems produced by iXsystems, and based on FreeBSD and Linux, using the OpenZFS file system. It is licensed under the terms of the BSD License and runs on commodity x86-64 hardware. 

The TrueNAS range includes free public versions (TrueNAS CORE, previously known as FreeNAS), commercial versions (TrueNAS Enterprise), and Linux versions (TrueNAS SCALE). It also offers hardware, from small home systems to large petabyte arrays, based on the above versions.

TrueNAS supports Windows, macOS and Unix clients and various virtualization hosts such as XenServer and VMware using the SMB, AFP, NFS, iSCSI, SSH, rsync and FTP/TFTP protocols. Advanced TrueNAS features include full-disk encryption and a plug-in architecture for third-party software.

Products
TrueNAS is the brand for iXsystems' open source network attached storage platform. It includes the following:

 TrueNAS CORE (previously FreeNAS) – a free file server and expandable platform based on FreeBSD.
 TrueNAS Enterprise – an enterprise file server for commercial use, also based on FreeBSD.
 TrueNAS SCALE – a free Linux based hyper-converged scale-out version of the TrueNAS platform.
 TrueNAS hardware – Enterprise Storage Arrays, a network-attached storage (NAS) systems, storage area network (SAN) devices, and High Availability systems, with up to 22 petabytes raw capacity.

The OpenZFS file system
TrueNAS supports the OpenZFS filesystem which provides data integrity checking to prevent data corruption, enable point in time snapshotting, replication and several levels of redundancy including striping, mirroring, striped mirrors (RAID 1+0), and three levels of RaidZ.

User experience
TrueNAS is managed through a comprehensive web interface that is supplemented by a minimal shell console that handles essential administrative functions. The web interface supports storage pool configuration, user management, sharing configuration and system maintenance. As an embedded system appliance, TrueNAS boots from a USB Flash device or SATA DOM. This image is configured using a USB Flash bootable installer. The TrueNAS operating system is fully independent of its storage disks, allowing its configuration database and encryption keys to be backed up and restored to a fresh installation of the Operating System. This separation also allows for TrueNAS system upgrades to be performed through the web interface.

History
The FreeNAS project was started in October 2005 by Olivier Cochard-Labbé who based it on the m0n0wall embedded firewall and FreeBSD 6.0. Volker Theile joined the project in July 2006 and became the project lead in April 2008. In September 2009, the development team concluded that the project, then at release .7, was due for a complete rewrite in order to accommodate modern features such as a plug-in architecture. Volker Theile decided that the project best be reimplemented using Debian Linux and shifted his development efforts to the interim CoreNAS project and eventually OpenMediaVault where he continues as the project lead. Cochard-Labbé responded to community objections to "The Debian version of FreeNAS" and resumed activity in the project and oversaw its transfer to FreeNAS user iXsystems. Developers Daisuke Aoyama and Michael Zoon continued developing FreeNAS 7 as the NAS4Free project. Meanwhile, iXsystems rewrote FreeNAS with a new architecture based on FreeBSD 8.1, releasing FreeNAS 8 Beta in November 2010. The plug-in architecture arrived with FreeNAS 8.2 and FreeNAS versioning was synchronized with FreeBSD for clarity. FreeNAS 8.3 introduced full-disk encryption and FreeBSD 9.1-based FreeNAS 9.1 brought an updated plug-in architecture that is compatible with the TrueOS Warden jail management framework. FreeNAS 9.1 was also the first version of FreeNAS to use the community-supported OpenZFS v5000 with Feature Flags. FreeNAS 9.2, based on FreeBSD 9.2 included performance improvements and introduced a REST API for remote system administration. FreeNAS 9.3, based on FreeBSD 9.3 introduced a ZFS-based boot device, an initial Setup Wizard and a high-performance in-kernel iSCSI server. FreeNAS 9.10, based on FreeBSD 10.3-RC3 brought an end to the FreeNAS/FreeBSD synchronized naming and introduced Graphite monitoring support and experimental support for the bhyve hypervisor.

In October 2015, ten years after the original FreeNAS release, FreeNAS 10 ALPHA was released, providing a preview of what would become FreeNAS Corral GA on March 15, 2017. FreeNAS Corral introduced a new graphical user interface, command-line interface, underlying middleware, container management system and virtual machine management system. FreeNAS Corral departs from FreeNAS by providing not only NAS functionality but also hyper-converged functionality thanks to its integrated virtual machine support. However, on April 12, 2017 iXsystems announced that FreeNAS Corral would instead be relegated to being a 'Technology Preview', citing issues such as "general instability, lack of feature parity with 9.10 (Jails, iSCSI, etc), and some users experiencing lower performance than expected" and the departure of the project lead. Instead, the decision was made to revert to the existing 9.10 code and bring Corral features to 9.10.3 and further.

In May 2017, iXsystems announced that FreeNAS 11 would be imminently released, which was based on 9.10 but included features such as an update of the FreeBSD operating system, virtual machine management, updates to jails, and a new beta user interface along the lines of Corral but based on Angular.

In March 2020, iXsystems announced that the 12.0 release will merge the FreeNAS code base with that of their commercial TrueNAS offering. FreeNAS will become TrueNAS CORE while TrueNAS will be renamed TrueNAS Enterprise. This change was made official with the release of TrueNAS 12.0 on October 20, 2020.

In October 2020, iXsystems announced a new product, TrueNAS SCALE would be developed. TrueNAS SCALE would still utilize ZFS, but be based on Debian Linux.

In February 2022, iX announced that TrueNAS SCALE has reached General Availability quality for their 22.02 release. 

In May 2022, iX announced that TrueNAS CORE, their FreeBSD Based version of TrueNAS, has reached General Availabilty and is suitable for large deployments.

Architecture
The 8.0 reimplementation of FreeNAS moved the project from a m0n0BSD/m0n0wall/PHP-based architecture to one based on FreeBSD's NanoBSD embedded build system, the Python programming language, the Django web application framework and the dōjō toolkit (JavaScript library). It also used the lighttpd web server, but this was replaced with nginx in FreeNAS 8.2. The terminated successor to 9.10.2, known as FreeNAS Corral, retained the nginx web server and ZFS-based boot device of FreeNAS but replaces the Django/dōjō web application framework with an original one. FreeNAS 11 implemented a new interface using Angular.

TrueNAS CORE (previously FreeNAS) Version History

Current TrueNAS CORE Release Features

Features and Jails shown are for the 13.0 branch.

Features

Administrative features
 Web-based graphical user interface with optional SSL encryption
 Localized into over 20 languages
 Web, console, and SSH access configurable
 Plug-in Architecture (see list below)
 Performance graphing
 Wide range of configurable alerts and alerting mechanisms, including log emails and reporting notification
 Downloadable configuration file and encryption keys
 S.M.A.R.T. disk diagnostics
 Local certificate management, including Certificate Authority role.
 2 factor authentication, LDAP, Active Directory, RADIUS, IPSec, Kerberos and other authentication/user management systems supported in FreeBSD and therefore available for TrueNAS (Note: some but not all supported in GUI).

File system features
 Highly resilient ZFS file system with Feature Flags (OpenZFS v5000) and theoretical storage limit of 16 Exabytes. ZFS file system features are fully configurable and include:
 Compression (including lz4 and gzip),
 Full-volume encryption (Disk encryption with GELI and AESNI hardware acceleration),
 Snapshots (which can be near-continual; snapshotting every 15-30 minutes is not uncommon),
 Data deduplication
 User quotas
 Physical disks are fully portable and can be moved without data loss to other FreeNAS servers, or to any other Operating System that supports a compatible version of OpenZFS.
 Data reliability features - mirroring / RAID (including ZFS RaidZ), multiple copies of selected data and metadata for reliability, and entire-system checksumming and background data repair as needed ("scrubbing") (see also: ZFS generally, which was designed expressly with the aim of ensuring data preservation) Server reliability features -
 Replication and failover
 Multi-version boot environment - the boot menu provides access to previous versions of TrueNAS which have been upgraded. In the event of a boot issue or system problem, TrueNAS can also load any of these at boot, as "known working" versions, without "rolling back" the system.
 Disk read and data import for UFS2, NTFS, FAT32 and EXT2/3
 User/Group permissions - Classic Unix/Linux permissions and/or ACL based (including ACLs for Microsoft file systems)

Built-in network services and features
 Protocols as standard - Samba/SMB/CIFS (for Microsoft and other networks), AFP (Apple), NFS, iSCSI, FTP/TFTP
 LDAP and Active Directory client support with Windows ACLs
 Apple Time Machine and Microsoft File History/Previous Versions support
 rsync data sync and replication (server/client)
 Link aggregation and failover
 VLAN networking
 Dynamic DNS client
 Remote syslogd forwarding
 SNMP monitoring
 Wide range of networking hardware and environments supported by FreeBSD, including copper cable, fiberoptic cable, WiFi
 Supports jumbo frames, hardware offloading (exact features offloaded vary by adapter), high bandwidth servicing (10G+)

 Other
 UPS (Uninterruptible power supply) support
 Virtual Machine host and management with GUI based management
 Jail management and templates - As of 11.0 release, TrueNAS(Formerly FreeNAS) is part-way switched from warden to iocage as jail manager; full iocage support is planned for 11.1
 iozone, netperf, OpenVPN, tmux and other utilities
 Over 20,000 packages and ports available and able to be installed from FreeBSD repositories.

Uses
 SoHo, SMB and Enterprise file serving
 Virtualization server storage backing
 Media center audio/video serving and streaming to DLNA devices

Awards
 VMware — "Ultimate Virtual Appliance Challenge, Consumer"
 sourceforge.net — Project of the Month, January 2007
 InfoWorld — Best of open source in storage
 MES Matters 2022 — Key Vendors Serving the Mid-Market
 Best In Biz Award — Most Innovative Product Line of the Year
 Tech Target Storage Magazine Gold Award — Asigra TrueNAS Backup Appliance

See also

 Unraid
 OpenMediaVault
 XigmaNAS
 Nexenta
 Openfiler
 Zentyal
 List of NAS manufacturers
 Comparison of iSCSI targets
 File area network
 Disk enclosure
 OpenWrt

References

External links

 

FreeBSD
Enterprise Linux distributions
Free file transfer software
Free software
Home servers
Network-attached storage